Mother Mountain is a  multi-summit, 3-mile long ridge-like mountain located in Mount Rainier National Park, in Pierce County of Washington state. The Wonderland Trail provides one approach option to this mountain, and the summit offers views of Mount Rainier. East Fay Peak is its nearest higher neighbor,  to the south. Precipitation runoff from Mother Mountain is drained by Cataract Creek on the south side of the mountain, and Ipsut Creek drains the north side of it, and both are tributaries of the Carbon River. The west side drains into Mowich Lake, and thence Mowich River.

History
The name Mother Mountain derives from the figure of a woman which can be seen silhouetted
along the northeast summit of the ridge. The name was officially adopted in 1913 by the United States Board on Geographic Names. The first ascent of Second Mother Mountain (6,375-ft) was made in 1938 by Maynard Miller and H. Kinzner.

Geology
This geological formation was formed by successive lava flows erupting from broad, low volcanos less than 25 million years ago. Large cirques on the north aspect once held voluminous glaciers during the Pleistocene.

Climate

Mother Mountain is located in the marine west coast climate zone of western North America. Most weather fronts originate in the Pacific Ocean, and travel northeast toward the Cascade Mountains. As fronts approach, they are forced upward by the peaks of the Cascade Range (Orographic lift), causing them to drop their moisture in the form of rain or snowfall onto the Cascades. As a result, the west side of the Cascades experiences high precipitation, especially during the winter months in the form of snowfall. During winter months, weather is usually cloudy, but, due to high pressure systems over the Pacific Ocean that intensify during summer months, there is often little or no cloud cover during the summer. The months July through September offer the most favorable weather for viewing or climbing this peak.

See also

 Geology of the Pacific Northwest

Gallery

References

External links
 National Park Service web site: Mount Rainier National Park
 Mother Mountain: weather forecast

Cascade Range
Mountains of Pierce County, Washington
Mountains of Washington (state)
Mount Rainier National Park
North American 1000 m summits